Schlichting jet is a steady, laminar, round jet, emerging into a stationary fluid of the same kind with very high Reynolds number. The problem was formulated and solved by Hermann Schlichting in 1933, who also formulated the corresponding planar Bickley jet problem in the same paper. The Landau-Squire jet from a point source is an exact solution of Navier-Stokes equations, which is valid for all Reynolds number, reduces to Schlichting jet solution at high Reynolds number, for distances far away from the jet origin.

Flow description
Consider an axisymmetric jet emerging from an orifice, located at the origin of a cylindrical polar coordinates , with  being the jet axis and  being the radial distance from the axis of symmetry. Since the jet is in constant pressure, the momentum flux in the  direction is constant and equal to the momentum flux at the origin,

The quantity  is called as the kinematic momentum flux. The boundary layer equations are

where  is the kinematic viscosity. The boundary conditions are

The Reynolds number of the jet,

is a large number for the Schlichting jet.

Self-similar solution

A self-similar solution exist for the problem posed. The self-similar variables are

Then the boundary layer equation reduces to

with boundary conditions . If  is a solution, then  is also a solution.

The constant  can be evaluated from the momentum condition,

Thus the solution is

increases linearly with distance along the axis. Schneider flow describes the flow induced by the jet due to the entrainment.

Other variations
Schlichting jet for the compressible fluid has been solved by M.Z. Krzywoblocki and D.C. Pack. Similarly, Schlichting jet with swirling motion is studied by H. Görtler.

See also
Landau-Squire jet
Schneider flow
Bickley jet

References

Flow regimes
Fluid dynamics